Crepidium ramosii is a species of plant in the family Orchidaceae endemic to the Philippines.

References

ramosii
Orchids of the Philippines